Donald L. Price (born c. 1935) is an American neuropathologist and professor at the Johns Hopkins School of Medicine born in Stamford, Connecticut. His research aims to understand the molecular basis of neurodegenerative diseases, particularly Alzheimer’s disease.  Price has received a number of awards for his work and served as the President of both the American Association of Neuropathologists and the Society for Neuroscience.

Early life 
Price attended Wesleyan University, where he received a Bachelor’s of Arts in English Literature. In 1961, he graduated from Albany Medical College of Union University, where he received a Medical Degree. After graduating from Albany Medical School of Union University, Dr Price was a Medical Intern and Resident at the New England Medical Center, Boston, MA ( 1961-1963) and Completed a Neurology Residency at the Mass General Hospital, Boston, MA (1963-1968). He was a Staff Neurologist at the National Naval Medical Center, Bethesda, MD(1966-1968). He returned to Boston as a Senior Fellow in Neuropathology at the Mass General (1968-1969)and a Research Fellow in Cell/Molecular Biology (Keith Porter)( 1969-1970) at Harvard University. anhwchilpweb|url=http://pathology.jhu.edu/department/priceResearchFund.pdf|title=The Donald L. Price Research Fund|date=May 18, 2008|website=Johns Hopkins Medicine}}</ref>

Career 
Price’s first faculty appointment was as an Assistant Professor in the Departments of Neurology and Pathology at Harvard Medical School in 1970. 
In 1971 , Price was recruited to the John’s Hopkins School of Medicine becoming the Founding Director, Division of Neuropathology. 
Presently ,Price is Professor Emeritus of Pathology, Neurology, and Neuroscience at the John’s Hopkins School of Medicine
 Price served as the President of American Association of Neuropathologists.) 1989-1990)ref></ref> From 2000-2001, he served as the President of the Society for Neuroscience.
Price is a Member of The Institute of Medicine( National Academy of Sciences)(1998) 

Over the past four decades , he has trained hundreds of medical and graduate students, house officers,and post doctoral fellows. His and prior trainees include Chairpersons  of Departments and many prominent basic scientists and clinicians at a variety of institutions( medical schools, universities, and government ) The vast majority of these individuals remain active in medicine and/or science. 
During the “Decade of the Brain“ (1990-2000), Price was ranked among the top ten neuroscientists as authors of high impact papers in neuroscience by Science Watch(12 102 2001)  </ref>

Research 
Price first focused on the biology of motor neurons, but later in his career, became more interested in brain mechanisms. He mainly used animal models in order to “allow a more direct insight into pathogenesis” rather than using human models. His particular research interests involve “age-associated neurodegenerative diseases, particularly [Alzheimer’s disease]”. H. In 1985, he became a Principal Investigator of the Alzheimer’s Disease Research Center at Johns Hopkins University.  Eventually he  became the director of the center and is now director emeritus.

Alzheimer's disease 
Price’s research has a focus on treatment for neurodegenerative conditions. His work with transgenic mice seeks to experimentally test new treatment mechanisms before they reach human subjects. These studies have identified specific genes that are often risk factors, particularly amyloid-prone genes, and attempted to correlate them to particular behaviors associated with Alzheimer’s disease. For example, his research has concluded that mutations to amyloid precursor proteins are linked to memory loss.  Price took part in the publication of the Basic Neurochemistry: Principles of Molecular, Cellular, and Medical Neurobiology text. He worked with colleagues Philip C. Wong and Tong Li to write a chapter  on Alzheimer’s disease and how it causes major defects within the brain. Alzheimer’s disease (AD) is one of Price’s most researched topics.  Price discovered that the neuroscience of AD is characterized by neuronal loss, the failure of functioning neurons, or the lack of neurofibrillary tangles (NFTs) within parts of the brain. In the publication, he discussed the neurofibrillary tangles and how they were most commonly found in the central superior nucleus. He further described that NFTs help determine the duration of the disease as well. Patients with a longer duration of AD had fewer NFTs than patients with a shorter duration of AD. The number of NFTs in the nuclei inversely reflect the rate of progression;  if only a small number of NFTs are found, then the disease progresses slower.

Awards and honors

Publications 

The list below are some of his most cited publications:

References 

1935 births
American neuropathologists
Harvard University alumni
Harvard Medical School faculty
Living people
People from Stamford, Connecticut
Wesleyan University alumni
Albany Medical College alumni
Johns Hopkins University faculty